Basile Detention Center  The detention center is located in Basile, Louisiana.  The facility is owned and operated by the GEO Group of Boca Raton, Florida.  The facility was designed and built by LCS Corrections Services, Inc. and was purchased from them by GEO in 2015. This company operates detention facilities throughout the world.

Statistics 

During the last 12-month period for which data is available, it was determined that 2,488 prisoners at Basile Detention Center were deported, released under supervision, or left ICE detention for another unstated reason.

References

Prisons in Louisiana
U.S. Immigration and Customs Enforcement
GEO Group